The 2021 UCI Cyclo-cross World Championships were held from 30 to 31 January 2021 in Ostend, Belgium.

Medal summary

Medals table

References

UCI Cyclo-cross World Championships
World Championships
2021 in Belgian sport
International cycle races hosted by Belgium
Sport in Ostend
UCI